Est! Est!! Est!!! di Montefiascone (also known as just Est! Est!! Est!!!) is an Italian wine region centered on the commune of Montefiascone in the province of Viterbo in Lazio.
 

The unusual name of the wine region dates back to a 12th-century tale of a German bishop traveling to the Vatican for a meeting with the pope. The bishop sent a prelate ahead of him to survey the villages along the route for the best wines. The 'wine scout' had instructions to write 'Est' (Latin for 'There is') on the door or on the wall of the inns he visited when he was particularly impressed with the quality of the wine they served so the bishop following on his trail would have known in advance where to make a stop. At a Montefiascone inn, the prelate was reportedly so overwhelmed with the local wine that he wrote Est! Est!! Est!!! on the door. While this tale has been widely repeated, with some variations (such as the event taking place in the 10th century and/or involving a Flemish bishop, attending the coronation of Henry V, Holy Roman Emperor instead of meeting the Pope, etc.), the story is considered by many wine experts, such as Master of Wine Mary Ewing-Mulligan, to be apocryphal.

Today, the wine region is known primarily for wine tourism, catering to the visitors of Lake Bolsena north of Rome, with comparatively little Est! Est!! Est!!! di Montefiascone being exported. Among wine critics, the wine often receives mixed opinions with wine experts such as Hugh Johnson and Jancis Robinson describing in The World Atlas of Wine Est! Est!! Est!!! di Montefiascone as "usually the dullest white wine with the strangest name in the world." Wine writers Joe Bastianich and David Lynch compares Est! Est!! Est!!! di Montefiascone to the Tuscan wines from Vernaccia di San Gimignano saying that the region's "...history is more compelling than what's currently in the glass."

Origins of the name

The story behind the name of Est! Est!! Est!!! di Montefiascone has been widely repeated for centuries and, though likely apocryphal, has served as a tourism draw for the region and gives some notoriety to the wine. While variations of the tale exist, the basic legend involves a traveling Catholic bishop on his way to Rome who sends a servant ahead to find places with the best wine for the bishop to enjoy. Visiting villages throughout Italy, the servant would scrawl Est (Latin for "There is", "it is", or "is") on the door of the places he found to have good wine for the bishop's party to later visit. The legend has it that the servant was so impressed with the wine being served at a Montefiascone inn that he enthusiastically scrawled Est! Est!! Est!!! on the door.

While that is the basic outline of the story, over the centuries several variations have popped up that slightly change some details. One of the more detailed retellings can be found in Tom Stevenson's Sotheby's Wine Encyclopedia where he pinpoints the events to late 1110 or early 1111 when a 12th-century German bishop, Johann Fugger, was traveling to Rome for the coronation of Henry V as Holy Roman Emperor. On his travels, Fugger sent his majordomo ahead of him to taste the local wines and report back which wines were Vinum est bonum. As with other retellings, the majordomo documented his research by writing Est in chalk on the door of the establishments whose wines he enjoyed and, being so impressed with the wines of Montefiascone, punctuated his message with multiple Est! Est!! Est!!!. But Stevenson also reports that the bishop, himself, was also so impressed with the wines that he canceled the rest of his journey and stayed in Montefiascone until his death. Today, there is a tomb in a local church in Montefiascone believed to be the resting place of Bishop Fugger, which bears the Latin inscription: "Est est est - Propter nimium est - Johannes de Foucris - dominus meus - mortuus est".

DOC regulations

The white blended wines of Est! Est!! Est!!! di Montefiascone received DOC status in 1966 and includes the volcanic soils encircling Lake Bolsena in the northern Latium region. According to DOC regulations (last changes approved on date 30-11-2011) the wine should come from grapes grown within the DOC area in the province of Viterbo and included in the administrative territory of the municipalities of Montefiascone, Bolsena, San Lorenzo Nuovo, Grotte di Castro, Gradoli, Capodimonte and Marta, harvested to a maximum yield of 13 tonnes/ha. The finished wine must have a minimum alcohol level of at least 11% and be composed of a blend of Trebbiano Toscano (known locally as Procanico) by a percentage between 50% and 65%, Malvasia bianca by a percentage between 10% and 20% and Trebbiano Giallo (known locally as Rosetto) by a percentage between 25%  and 40%.

Wine styles
Wine writer Joe Bastianich describes the wines of Est! Est!! Est!!! di Montefiascone as mildly aromatic with apple notes and high acidity. The wines can be produced in dry and sweeter abboccato styles. Locally, the wines are often paired with Roman cuisine such as fritto misto and deep-fried artichokes.

One major producer is Falesco.  Their version has been called a "generic Umbrian (sic) cheap white known around the world."

References

Italian DOC
Italian wine
Province of Viterbo
Henry V, Holy Roman Emperor